John Warkworth DD (c. 1425 – 1500) was an English churchman and academic, a Master of Peterhouse, Cambridge. He is no longer considered to be a chronicler of Edward IV, the so-called Warkworth's Chronicle now being attributed to one of two other fellows of Peterhouse. Warkworth has been subject to another confusion, with another fellow of Peterhouse of the same name.

References

Masters of Peterhouse, Cambridge
Year of birth uncertain
1500 deaths
15th-century English educators
1425 births
English male writers